In 1933, the Great Western Railway introduced the first of what was to become a very successful series of diesel railcars, which survived in regular use into the 1960s, when they were replaced with the new British Rail "first generation" type diesel multiple units.

Design

Bodywork
The original design featured streamlined bodywork, which was very much the fashion at the time.  The rounded lines of the first examples built led to their nickname: "flying banana".  The preserved W4W is an example of the original, rounded body shape.  Later "razor edge" examples, such as No. 27 (pictured), had much more angular (and practical) bodywork, yet the nickname persisted for these too.

Heating
The interiors of railcars No. 1 to No. 18 were heated by using waste heat from the engine cooling water. This system proved unreliable in service due to issues with the thermostat valves employed. Later vehicles from No. 19 onward abandoned this system to its unreliability and because their revised specification demanded that they be able to haul steam heated rolling stock. 

These later vehicles, No. 19 onwards, were equipped with steam heating systems. Which were capable of heating both the vehicles interior and that of any additional trailed vehicles, via a steam supply to the standard steam heating equipment. Steam was produced by a fully automatic Vapor Clarkson steam generator manufactured by Gresham and Craven Ltd under licence from the Vapor car co. The generator was of the water tube with  counterflow arrangement type, and could supply up to 300 lb of steam per hour, at 45 lb per square inch. The quantity of steam supplied could be varied by the driver to suit the demand required by a solo railcar, or plus one, or plus two, trailer vehicles. The fuel used was the same diesel used for the railcar's engines. However, it was stored in a separate 45 gallon tank. The water supply for the heating system consisted of a single 100 gallon tank.

Powertrain
Railcars No. 1 to No. 18 were powered by a high speed diesel engine manufactured by A.E.C, producing a maximum brake power output of 130 hp (97 kW). The engine was of the straight 6 configuration, with a bore of 115 mm diameter and a stroke of 142 mm. This gave a total displacement of 8.85 litres. The maximum operating speed was 1,800 rpm.

Railcars No. 19 onwards were powered by a modified version of the previous engine. This engine was equipped with direct injection and the bore diameter was enlarged to 120 mm. The stroke remaining at 142 mm. This engine produced a lower brake power output of 105 hp at 1,650 rpm.

An unusual feature was the external cardan shaft drive from the gearbox on the rear of a horizontally mounted engine to road-vehicle style reduction boxes outboard of the two axles on one bogie. Later units had two such engine and drive combinations placed on opposite sides. Railcars 19-20 were fitted with a separate high-low ratio gearbox on the final drive side of the gearbox. Railcar W20W retains this in preservation.

Brakes

The brake system on railcars No. 2, 3 and 4 was unconventional. Instead of the usual vacuum actuated tread brakes used on most British rolling stock of the period, an automotive style system was adopted, utilising vacuum-hydraulically actuated drum brakes. A vacuum brake cylinder - hydraulic master cylinder set was mounted on each bogie. From the master cylinder, hydraulic fluid passed through hoses to the operating cylinders. The operating cylinders actuated cam mechanisms within the brake drums to apply the internally expanding brake shoes to the inside circumference of the brake drums. The 20 inch internal diameter cast steel brake drums were bolted to the inside face of one wheel per axle. The vacuum necessary for brake operation was created by three rotary exhausters, two being driven directly from the engines and one by each engine. The third exhauster was chain driven by the final drive shaft. 

This arrangement allowed vacuum to be maintained during coasting, when the engines would be shut down. The system operated at a vacuum of 22 to 24 inches of mercury. This vacuum being stored in four reservoirs on the chassis. Another unusual aspect to this system was that vacuum was increased in the vacuum brake cylinder to apply the brakes. This being contrary to normal british railway practice, in which vacuum is reduced to apply the brakes.

Operational history

This was the first long distance diesel express service in Britain, and covered the  miles between Birmingham and Cardiff in 2 hours 20 minutes. This was intended as a businessman's service, fares were charged at the normal rate, however bookings were limited by the 44 seats of the railcar.

The next three units, nos. 5 to 7, entered service in July 1935 and had 70 seats. These were used on services between London, Oxford and Hereford. The next batches of railcars numbered 8 to 34 were of various different designs and entered service in batches between 1936 and 1941, two of these (nos. 17 and 34) were designed for express parcels services rather than passenger services.

The earlier units operated as single railcars. The final four, numbered 35 to 38, were twin coupled units with the driving cabs situated at the outer ends of the set, these were in effect the forerunners of today's diesel multiple units (DMUs). These had the capacity for 104 passengers, however a standard corridor coach could be installed between the two cars, and this could increase the seating capacity to 184. These were introduced in November 1941 and worked the Birmingham-Cardiff service.

Fleet list

Five of the 38 railcars were destroyed by fires:
No 9 was burnt out at Heyford in July 1945; officially condemned in May 1946
No 10 was burnt out at Bridgnorth in March 1956; officially condemned in May 1956
No 35 and No 36 were destroyed by fire at St Anne's Park, Bristol in April 1956; officially condemned in April 1957
No 37 was damaged by fire in February 1949 and was stored until being scrapped; officially condemned in September 1949

Preservation
Three of the GWR railcars have survived into preservation, which are as follows:

Models
Hornby Railways manufacture a model of the 1940-style railcar in OO gauge, using tooling acquired in their takeover of Lima. In late 2017, Dapol released an OO model of the streamlined 1936 Gloucester RCW railcars in a variety of liveries and numbers.  Graham Farish has produced an N-gauge model (with various numbers, e.g. 19, 22, and 20), both before and after their takeover by Bachmann.

See also

 GWR petrol-electric railcar
 GWR steam rail motors
 GNR(I) AEC Class railcars
 ČSD Class M 290.0

References

Further reading

External links

 The Great Western Archive
 British Diesel Rail Coaches

 Railcars
Railcars
Park Royal Vehicles multiple units
Gloucester multiple units
Railcars of the United Kingdom
Railcars GWR
United Kingdom streamliner trains
Train-related introductions in 1934